Hard Talk is a live album by American jazz pianist Mal Waldron recorded in 1974 and released by the Enja label.

Reception
The Allmusic review by Scott Yanow awarded the album 4½ stars stating "This is a strong live set that successfully combines together some distinctive musical personalities".

Track listing
All compositions by Mal Waldron
 "Snake Out" — 12:28 
 "Hard Talk" — 19:17 
 "Russian Melody" — 6:03 
 "Hurray for Herbie" — 13:29 Bonus track on CD reissue 
Recorded at the East-West Jazz Festival in the Meistersingerhalle in Nürnberg, West Germany on May 4, 1974.

Personnel
 Mal Waldron — piano 
 Manfred Schoof  — cornet 
 Steve Lacy — soprano saxophone    
 Isla Eckinger — bass 
 Allen Blairman — drums

References

Enja Records albums
Mal Waldron live albums
Steve Lacy (saxophonist) live albums
1974 live albums